Pike County Schools is a public school district in Pike County, Alabama, United States, based in Troy, Alabama.

Schools
The Pike County School District has three elementary schools, one middle school, two high schools and one vocational facility.

References

External links

Troy-Pike Center for Technology

School districts in Alabama
Education in Pike County, Alabama